The Drunkard (French: La pocharde) is a 1953 French drama film directed by Georges Combret and starring Pierre Brasseur, Monique Mélinand and François Patrice. It was shot at the Billancourt Studios in Paris. The film's sets were designed by the art director Marcel Magniez. It is based on the 1898 novel of the same title by Jules Mary which had previously been made into a 1921 silent film The Drunkard and a 1937 sound film The Drunkard.

Cast
 Pierre Brasseur as Maître Pierre Renneville  
 Monique Mélinand as Denise Lamarche  
 François Patrice as Jacques  
 Sophie Leclair as Gisèle  
 Henri Nassiet as Le docteur Marignan  
 Alfred Adam as Georges Lamarche  
 Albert Duvaleix as Le président 
 Odette Laure as Madame Berthelin  
 Jacqueline Porel as Lucienne Marignan  
 Marie-France as Nicole  
 Lucienne Le Marchand as Madame Lamarche mère  
 Pauline Carton as Mademoiselle Michel - La Punaise  
 Alice Tissot as Madame Pitois - La Pimbêche  
 André Gabriello as Berthelin 
 Marcelle Arnold as Madame Fournier  
 Charles Bouillaud as Le substitut Barillier  
 Henri Coutet as Un homme  
 Paul Demange as Un habitué  
 Cécile Didier as Hortense 
 Michel Etcheverry as L'avocat général  
 Jean Lanier as Le professeur  
 Roger Vincent as Le médecin légiste

References

Bibliography 
 Philippe Rège. Encyclopedia of French Film Directors, Volume 1. Scarecrow Press, 2009.

External links 
 

1953 films
1953 drama films
French drama films
1950s French-language films
Films directed by Georges Combret
1950s legal films
Films about alcoholism
French black-and-white films
Films shot at Billancourt Studios
Films based on French novels
Remakes of French films
1950s French films